is a 1952 Japanese drama film directed by Mikio Naruse, starring Kinuyo Tanaka in the title role. The screenplay by Yūko Mizuki is based on the prize-winning entry of a school essay-writing competition.

Plot
Told from the viewpoint of Toshiko, the second child of three of the Fukuhara family, the film depicts her mother Masako's struggles during the post-war years. First Masako loses her son, who fell ill from working in a velvet cloth shop, then her husband Ryosaku, who ruined his health from overworking during the war. Ryosaku's friend Kimura joins the family's laundry shop, showing Masako how to handle the business, watched warily by Toshiko who objects the idea that her mother might marry him. To reduce the Fukuhara's financial hardships, and because they are childless after losing their son in the war, Ryosaku's brother and his wife adopt the younger daughter Chako. Kimura finally leaves the business to open his own laundry shop in Chiba, and Toshiko and young baker Shinjiro muse about getting married one day. Watching her mother play with her little cousin Tetsu, Toshiko wonders if she is happy, wishing that she will live a long life.

Cast
 Kinuyo Tanaka as Masako Fukuhara
 Kyōko Kagawa as Toshiko Fukuhara
 Eiji Okada as Shinjiro
 Daisuke Katō as Kimura
 Yafu Mishima as Ryosaku Fukuhara 
 Nakabe Chieko as Noriko, Masako's sister
 Eiko Miyoshi as Ryosaku's mother
 Chieko Nakakita as Noriko

Reception
Film historian Donald Richie called Mother one of Naruse's best films, but also an atypical one, because the protagonists escape the tragedy that usually hangs above Naruse's characters. Naruse biographer Catherine Russell noted a higher degree of sentimentality in this film compared to other works by the director of this period.

Mother was screened in Paris in 1954 and received the attention of critics like André Bazin and the writers of the Cahiers du cinéma.

Awards
1953 - Blue Ribbon Awards 
 Best Director – Mikio Naruse
 Best Supporting Actor – Daisuke Katō

1953 – Mainichi Film Award
 Best Film Score – Ichirō Saitō
 Best Supporting Actor – Daisuke Katō
 Best Supporting Actress – Kyōko Kagawa

References

External links
 
 
 

1952 drama films
1952 films
Japanese black-and-white films
Japanese drama films
Shintoho films
Films directed by Mikio Naruse
Films scored by Ichirō Saitō
1950s Japanese films